Conrad Weiser High School is a public high school in Robesonia in Berks County, Pennsylvania. It is part of the Conrad Weiser Area School District and serves students in grades 9–12 in South Heidelberg Township, Heidelberg Township, North Heidelberg Township, and Marion Township and the boroughs of Wernersville, Robesonia, and Womelsdorf. Eight properties in a housing development in West Cocalico in Lancaster County also attend the high school.

According to the National Center for Education Statistics, Conrad Weiser High School reported an enrollment of 809 pupils in grades 9–12 as of the 2020-21 school year.

Extracurriculars
The high school offers a wide variety of clubs, arts, and sports activities.

Sports
The District funds:

Boys
Baseball - AA
Basketball- AA
Bowling - AA
Cross Country - AA
Football - AAAA
Golf - AA
Indoor Track and Field - AA
Lacrosse - AA
Soccer - AA
Swimming and Diving - AA
Tennis - AA
Track and Field - AA
Volleyball - AA
Wrestling	- AA

Girls
Basketball - AA
Bowling - AA
Cross Country - AAA
Indoor Track and Field
Field Hockey - AA
Lacrosse - AA
Soccer (Fall) - AAA
Softball - AAA
Swimming and Diving - AAA
Girls' Tennis - AAA
Track and Field - AA
Volleyball

References

External links
Conrad Weiser High School Website
Conrad Weiser Area School District Website
Conrad Weiser Scouts Football

Buildings and structures in Reading, Pennsylvania
Public high schools in Pennsylvania
Schools in Berks County, Pennsylvania